The Huon melidectes or Huon honeyeater (Melidectes foersteri) is a species of bird in the family Meliphagidae. It is endemic to Papua New Guinea.
Its natural habitat is subtropical or tropical moist montane forest.

References

Huon melidectes
Birds of the Huon Peninsula
Huon melidectes
Taxonomy articles created by Polbot